The girls' slalom competition of the alpine skiing events at the 2012 Winter Youth Olympics in Innsbruck, Austria, was held on January 20, at the Patscherkofel. 54 athletes from 47 different countries took part in this event.

Results

References

Alpine skiing at the 2012 Winter Youth Olympics
Youth